Mombasa Air Safari (known as MAS) is a Kenya coast scheduled airline.

History 
Originally started in 1970 as Rapid Air, the company was purchased in 1974 and renamed Mombasa Air Services. Based in Mombasa MAS has, since that date,  always served the coast tourism industry. An additional MAS company, Malindi Air Services, was created with the purchase of Sunbird Aviation ( Malindi) in 1977. A further company, Mombasa Air Services (Ukunda) Limited was added the same year with the purchase of Amphibians Ltd, based at Diani Beach at Ukunda airfield. The three companies were known as the M.A.S. group, and a fourth organisation, Mombasa Air School, was added to the group as an ab-initio pilot training school in 1978.

To inject capital and provide growth the MAS group of companies was sold in 1982 to CMC Aviation, owned by Cooper Motor Corporation, a publicly-traded company, based in Nairobi. The MAS identity was changed to Cooper Skybird. In 1986 there was a further change of ownership to another publicly traded group, and the airline was named Prestige Air, and all its operations were transferred to Nairobi. The company eventually was wound down and ceased flight operations.

In 1985 the original owners brought back the MAS name with a new aviation company under a new AOC that became known as Mombasa Air Safari. MAS operates along the Kenya coast with hubs at Mombasa ( Moi Airport) and Diani Beach (Ukunda Airfield) with regular departures also from Malindi.

The airline colours are dark blue, light blue and gold and in 2004 the logo was changed to a lions paw, which is featured on all MAS aircraft tail fins. The MAS Air Operator Certificate Number 016 provides for air charter and also scheduled services for both PAX and CARGO operation. In 2008 the Kenya Ministry of Transport granted MAS the status of a designated carrier to for services to Tanzania.

In 1995 the owners/directors of MAS created a separate maintenance company, Benair Engineering Limited that holds an Authorised Maintenance Certificate (AMO), based at Mombasa's Moi International Airport, to service the MAS fleet and undertake third-party maintenance to other airlines such as Blue Sky Aviation Services. Benair is an authorised LET Service Centre.

Fleet
Mombasa Air Safari operates eight Cessna 208 Grand Caravan aircraft.

Destinations
In 2018, Mombasa Air Safari flew to the following locations:
Amboseli
Diani Beach
Island of Lamu
Malindi
Masai Mara
Meru National Park
Mombasa International Airport
Samburu
Tsavo
Nairobi Wilson airport
Zanzibar
Juba
Pemba

Accidents
In 1998 aircraft with registration number 5Y-MAS, a 19-seat Let L-410 Turbolet crashed immediately after takeoff from Ol Kiombo Airstrip in the Masai Mara. No passengers were on board. Both pilots died. The accident report found no technical problem and cited possible pilot error with the flap settings.

Two pilots and two passengers died on Wednesday 22 August 2012, after a 19-seat Let L-410UVP-E9, registration number 5Y-UV7, with 13 people on board, including 2 crew, crashed at an airstrip in the Maasai Mara Game Reserve. Six passengers on board the aircraft, belonging to Mombasa Air Safari, were seriously injured as the pilots took off from Ngerende Airstrip near the Mara Safari Club.

Key people

 Mohamed Harunany, Managing Director
 Manjit Kalsi, Maintenance Director
 Muzahir Khan, Chief Pilot and Training Captain

References

 Kenya Civil Aviation Authority
 Kenya Association of Tour Operators.
 Kenya Air Operators Association
 www.aviation-safety.net › Database › 1999

External links
 
 

Airlines of Kenya
Airlines established in 1985
Kenyan companies established in 1985